Fire The Cannons is the debut album by rock band Jet Lag Gemini. The album spawned the singles, "Run This City" and "Fit to Be Tied". The album was released on Doghouse Records. The album was released on January 22, 2008.

Track listing
 Run This City
 Doctor, Please (There's Something Wrong with Me)
 The Bad Apple(s)
 Bittersweet
 Stepping Stone
 Fit to Be Tied
 Just Say How
 If It Was Up to Me
 Every Minute
 Keep This with You
 Picture Frames

References

2008 albums
Jet Lag Gemini albums